Hasan Fehmi Ataç (1879 – 16 September 1961) was a Turkish politician and a member of both the Grand National Assembly of the Republic of Turkey (the Turkish Parliament) and the earlier Chamber of Deputies of the Ottoman Empire (the lower house of the Ottoman Parliament). As a member of both parliaments, Hasan Fehmi was a deputy representing Gümüşhane, the place of his birth.

After his career in the Grand National Assembly, Hasan Fehmi was appointed by Mustafa Kemal Atatürk to be the Minister of Agriculture and Minister of Finance. Later in life, he was awarded the Medal of Independence with Red-Green Ribbon for his services to the Republic of Turkey.

Early life and career
Hasan Fehmi was born in Gümüşhane in 1879 and was the son of Kadirbeyzade Mehmet Salim Beyin. Fehmi went on to receive his local education at the Rüştiye school located in the Süleymaniye district of Gümüşhane. In his later life, however, Fehmi did not have an opportunity to attain higher education. Soon thereafter, Fehmi became a politician and a member of the Chamber of Deputies of the Ottoman Empire from Gümüşhane in its second and third sessions during the disintegrating Empire's Second Constitutional Era, and after the fall of the Ottoman Empire, became a deputy in the newly established Republic of Turkey. He served as deputy of Gümüşhane in the first period of the convening of the Grand National Assembly until the eighth period. On 17 October 1920, during his career as a deputy, Fehmi provided important testimony concerning the Armenian deportations during a secret conference in the national assembly:

During the testimony, Mustafa Kemal Atatürk, the first president of the Republic of Turkey, presided over the national assembly. Fehmi also provided testimony regarding the confiscation of Armenians goods and property during another secret session of the national assembly:

Amid protests that he was uneducated, Fehmi was appointed by Atatürk as the Finance Minister on 24 April 1922 and served until 2 January 1925. During his career as a Finance Minister, Fehmi managed to provide needed provisions of the Turkish army after Turkish War of Independence. After serving as Finance Minister for three years, Fehmi became the Minister of Agriculture between 22 November 1924 and 3 March 1925.

Fehmi was married and had one child.

He was also awarded the Medal of Independence with Red-Green Ribbon.

Fehmi died on 16 September 1961 at the age of 82.

See also

 Mustafa Kemal Atatürk
 Turkish National Movement
 Chamber of Deputies (Ottoman Empire)
 Witnesses and testimonies of the Armenian genocide

Notes

References

People from Gümüşhane
Ministers of Finance of Turkey
Agriculture ministers of Turkey
Food ministers of Turkey
Members of the Grand National Assembly of Turkey
1879 births
1961 deaths
Witnesses of the Armenian genocide
Members of the 1st government of Turkey